Paul Knabenshue (1883 – February 1, 1942) was an American career foreign service officer.

Knabenshue was the United States Consul at Beirut, Syria (1919–1928) and Consul General at Jerusalem. He was also Minister Resident/Consul General to Iraq from 1932 until his recess appointment expired March 4, 1933.  He was appointed again two weeks later and died at post on February 1, 1942.  He was the first resident minister consulate general there was raised the previous year to a legation.

References

1883 births
1942 deaths
American consuls
People from Toledo, Ohio
American expatriates in Syria
American expatriates in Mandatory Palestine
American expatriates in Iraq